Pericompsus is a genus of ground beetles in the family Carabidae. There are more than 70 described species in Pericompsus.

Species
These 71 species belong to the genus Pericompsus:

 Pericompsus acon Erwin, 1974  (South America)
 Pericompsus alcimus Erwin, 1974  (South America)
 Pericompsus amygdali Erwin, 1974  (South America)
 Pericompsus anassa Erwin, 1974  (South America)
 Pericompsus andinus (Jensen-Haarup, 1910)  (Argentina)
 Pericompsus australis (Schaum, 1863)  (Australasia)
 Pericompsus bilbo Erwin, 1974  (South America)
 Pericompsus bogani (Darlington, 1963)  (Australia)
 Pericompsus brasiliensis (R.F.Sahlberg, 1847)  (South America and Mexico)
 Pericompsus callicalymma Erwin, 1974  (South America)
 Pericompsus carinatus Erwin, 1974  (South America)
 Pericompsus catamarcensis Roig-Juñent & Scheibler, 2004  (Argentina)
 Pericompsus centroplagiatus (Putzeys, 1845)  (South America)
 Pericompsus circuliformis (Solier, 1849)  (Chile)
 Pericompsus clitellaris (Erichson, 1847)  (South America)
 Pericompsus commotes Erwin, 1974  (South America)
 Pericompsus concinnus (LaFerté-Sénectère, 1841)  (South America)
 Pericompsus cordatus Baehr, 2017  (Australia)
 Pericompsus crossarchon Erwin, 1974  (South America)
 Pericompsus crossodmos Erwin, 1974  (South America)
 Pericompsus crossotus Erwin, 1974  (South America)
 Pericompsus diabalius Erwin, 1974  (South America)
 Pericompsus dynastes Erwin, 1974  (South America)
 Pericompsus elegantulus (LaFerté-Sénectère, 1841)  (the Caribbean Sea)
 Pericompsus ephippiatus (Say, 1830)  (Central America, North America, and Mexico)
 Pericompsus eubothrus Erwin, 1974  (South America)
 Pericompsus gongylus Erwin, 1974  (Mexico)
 Pericompsus gracilior (Bates, 1884)  (South America and Mexico)
 Pericompsus grossepunctatus Bates, 1871  (South America)
 Pericompsus habitans (Sloane, 1896)  (Australia)
 Pericompsus hirsutus Schaum, 1863  (South America)
 Pericompsus histrionellus Bates, 1884  (South America)
 Pericompsus immaculatus Bates, 1871  (South America and Mexico)
 Pericompsus incisus Bates, 1871  (South America)
 Pericompsus jamcubanus Erwin, 1974  (the Caribbean)
 Pericompsus jeppeseni (Jensen-Haarup, 1910)  (Argentina)
 Pericompsus jucundus Schaum, 1859  (South America)
 Pericompsus laetulus LeConte, 1852  (Central America, North America, and Mexico)
 Pericompsus leechi Erwin, 1974  (Mexico)
 Pericompsus leucocarenus Erwin, 1974  (Central America and Mexico)
 Pericompsus longulus Bates, 1878  (Central America and Mexico)
 Pericompsus metallicus Bates, 1871  (South America)
 Pericompsus micropegasus Erwin, 1974  (South America)
 Pericompsus morantensis Erwin, 1974  (the Lesser Antilles and Hispaniola)
 Pericompsus nevermanni (Darlington, 1934)  (Central America)
 Pericompsus nonandinus Erwin, 1974  (South America)
 Pericompsus olliffi (Sloane, 1896)  (Australia)
 Pericompsus pauli Erwin, 1974  (Central America and Mexico)
 Pericompsus pegasus Erwin, 1974  (South America)
 Pericompsus philipi Erwin, 1974  (the Caribbean)
 Pericompsus picticornis Bates, 1871  (South America)
 Pericompsus polychaetus Erwin, 1974  (South America)
 Pericompsus prionomus Erwin, 1974  (Central America)
 Pericompsus pubifrons (Darlington, 1963)  (Australia)
 Pericompsus punctipennis (W.J.MacLeay, 1871)  (Australia)
 Pericompsus reichei (Putzeys, 1845)  (South America and Mexico)
 Pericompsus reticulatus Erwin, 1974  (South America)
 Pericompsus rorschachinus Erwin, 1974  (South America)
 Pericompsus sagma Erwin, 1974  (Mexico)
 Pericompsus sellatus LeConte, 1852  (North America and Mexico)
 Pericompsus semistriatus (Blackburn, 1888)  (Australia)
 Pericompsus seticollis (Sloane, 1896)  (Australia)
 Pericompsus silicis Erwin, 1974  (South America)
 Pericompsus stenocitharus Erwin, 1974  (South America)
 Pericompsus striatopunctatus Baehr, 1983  (South America)
 Pericompsus subincisus Erwin, 1974  (South America)
 Pericompsus tetraphalarus Erwin, 1974  (South America)
 Pericompsus tlaloc Erwin, 1974  (Central America and Mexico)
 Pericompsus tolype Erwin, 1974  (South America)
 Pericompsus univittatus (Jensen-Haarup, 1910)  (Chile and Argentina)
 Pericompsus yarrensis (Blackburn, 1892)  (Australia)

References

External links

 

Trechinae